Planinitsa is a village in Ruen Municipality, in Burgas Province, in southeastern Bulgaria.

References

Villages in Burgas Province